Sharon Osbourne Management is a talent management company set up by Sharon Osbourne that manages acts in the entertainment industry. Though mostly music acts, it has guided the careers of husband Ozzy Osbourne, children Kelly Osbourne and Jack Osbourne, as well as The Smashing Pumpkins, Coal Chamber, Queen, Gary Moore, Motörhead, Lita Ford, and ELO.

References

Ozzy Osbourne